Universal Wrestling Federation (UWF) was a professional wrestling promotion based in Marina del Rey, California from 1990 to 1996. This is a list of titles that were awarded and defended in the UWF. 

Not all championships were active during the entire history of the promotion.

UWF Americas Championship
The UWF Americas Championship was a short lived secondary title in the Universal Wrestling Federation that was created not long before the federation folded.

UWF Intercontinental Heavyweight Championship
The UWF Intercontinental Heavyweight Championship was a secondary title in the Universal Wrestling Federation. It was awarded to Bob Orton, Jr. at a television taping, but it was only defended once.

UWF Israeli Championship
The UWF Israeli Championship was a secondary title in the Universal Wrestling Federation. It was awarded to Joshua Ben-Gurion in May 1991 and retired in November 1991.

UWF Junior Heavyweight Championship
The UWF Junior Heavyweight Championship was a secondary title in the Universal Wrestling Federation. Jack Armstrong became the first and only champion by defeating Mando Guerrero at the final UWF show.

UWF MGM Grand Championship
The UWF MGM Grand Championship was a secondary title in the Universal Wrestling Federation. Tyler Mane became the first and only champion by defeating Steve Ray at the final UWF show.

UWF Midget World Championship
The UWF Midget World Championship was a secondary title in the Universal Wrestling Federation. At the final UWF show, Little Tokyo beat the Karate Kid to become the first and only champion.

UWF North American Championship
The UWF North American Championship was a secondary title in the Universal Wrestling Federation. It was awarded to Tony Capone at a television taping and defended once before being retired.

UWF Southern States Championship
The UWF Southern States Championship was a secondary title in the Universal Wrestling Federation.

UWF SportsChannel Television Championship
The UWF SportsChannel Television Championship was the premier title in the Universal Wrestling Federation from 1991 through 1992. The belt was introduced through a 16-man Tournament held during TV Tapings in April 1991 and June 1991. The winner of the tournament was crowned in a finals match at Beach Brawl. The title was named after SportsChannel, the network that aired UWF's weekly series Fury Hour.

UWF Women's World Championship
The UWF Women's World Championship was a title that could only be won by women in the Universal Wrestling Federation.

UWF World Heavyweight Championship
The UWF World Heavyweight Championship was intended to be the premier title of the Universal Wrestling Federation in 1994. It was awarded to Steve Williams on September 23, 1994, but it was not seen again after that show.

UWF World Tag Team Championship
The UWF World Tag Team Championship was a title in the Universal Wrestling Federation. The Killer Bees won the title at the UWF's final show, so the belts were never defended.

See also
List of former Universal Wrestling Federation (Herb Abrams) personnel

References

Championships